Gjonaj is a village in Prizren municipality, Kosovo.

History
In the place where Gjonaj is today may have stood the town of Guri i Hasit. In the area in and around Gjonaj six Catholic Albanian villages were mentioned in the 1348 Stefan Dušan chrysobull. A church in Gjonaj is possibly one of the oldest Roman Catholic churches in Kosovo. Gjonaj may have been the birthplace of Andrea and Pjetër Bogdani.

Notable People
Andrea Bogdani, 17th century Albanian scholar and priest.
Pjetër Bogdani, 17th century Albanian priest, scholar and patriot.
Elvis Rexhbeçaj, footballer (born 1997)*

Notes

References 

Villages in Prizren